Remida or Re Mida may refer to:

 A recycling concept promoted by the Reggio Children Foundation
 Re Mida, the Italian name for King Midas
 Clemensia remida, a moth native to Guatemala